Little Drayton Halt railway station was a station in Market Drayton, Shropshire, England. The station was opened in 1935 and closed on 6 October 1941.

References

Disused railway stations in Shropshire
Railway stations in Great Britain opened in 1935
Railway stations in Great Britain closed in 1941
Former Great Western Railway stations
Market Drayton